The Poll Dorset, a short-wool, meat-producing sheep, was developed in Australia between 1937 and 1954 with the aim of breeding a true Dorset type sheep without horns. The poll gene was introduced into Dorset Horn flocks from two other polled breeds and following a strict back-mating programme achieved close to 100% of Dorset Horn blood. Its main distinguishing features are its hornless appearance, long, lean square body set on short legs, pink skin and 'spongy' short-stapled wool. The Poll Dorset produces a fleece of white, dense downs type wool of 30 microns fibre diameter and it has a white wool-free face. The breed was developed at a property called Valmore in Whitemore, Tasmania, a noted centre for pedigree livestock stud farms. The Poll Dorset resulted from the introduction of Corriedale and Ryeland blood into the Dorset Horn.

Poll Dorset rams are the most commonly used sire for the production of prime lambs in Australia. Ewes are noted for their high fertility, mothering and milking ability. The characteristics of the breed such as rapid growth rate, superior fleshing and muscular development make them ideally suited for the meat trade. Lambs sired by Poll Dorsets can satisfy the lightweight Middle Eastern market, the local market or the export market to the US at 20 to 25 kg or heavier. Poll Dorset carcases have excelled in Australian carcase competitions having very good eye muscle and a good lean meat to fat ratio. Poll Dorset genes have also been a major contributor to the developing White Suffolk breed and almost all other prime lamb composite breeds in Australia.

Export sales have been made to Africa, Asia, Europe and North and South America.

In 1992 a group of Poll Dorset breeders established Meat Elite Australia to share genetics and to progeny-test elite young sires to identify animals that will benefit the Australian sheep-meat industry. The Poll Dorset breed, though less elite in terms of thermotolerance  and in high-altitude sustainability  when compared to other breeds, has been consistently researched for improvement in hopes of mass breeding to aid in the sheep-meat and farming industry.

The Australian Poll Dorset is not to be confused with the Polled Dorset that was developed at North Carolina State University in the early 1950s.

Citations

References
"The Land Stock Types"

External links
 http://www.polldorset.org.au/
 http://www.meatelite.com.au/Main.asp?_=Meat%20Elite%20Australia%20-%20Poll%20Dorsets%20Leading%20the%20Way

Sheep breeds originating in Australia
Sheep breeds